3F8 is a murine IgG3 monoclonal antibody which binds to GD2.

It has been used in the detection and treatment of neuroblastoma. For imaging neuroblastoma, it is labelled with one of the radioisotopes iodine-124 and iodine-131.

See also 
 Monoclonal antibody therapy

References 

Unnamed monoclonal antibodies